Śakra or Sakra may refer to:
an epithet of Indra
Śakra (Buddhism), a deity in Buddhism
Sakrah, a village in the Homs Governorate, Syria
Sakra (Vidhan Sabha constituency), Bihar, India
Sakra (film), 2023 film, China/Hong Kong